The 1933 South American Championships in Athletics  were held in Montevideo, Uruguay, between 6 and 9 April.

Medal summary

Men's events

Medal table

External links
 Men Results – GBR Athletics
 Women Results – GBR Athletics

S
South American Championships in Athletics
1933 in South American sport
International athletics competitions hosted by Uruguay
1933 in Uruguayan sport